Guy Cromwell Field FBA (15 January 1887 – 28 April 1955) was a British philosopher.  He was Professor of Philosophy, at the University of Bristol 1926–1952 and its Pro-Vice-Chancellor 1944–1945 and 1947–1952.  He was the grandson of Jesse Collings.

Works
Field published:

Guild Socialism (1920)
Moral Theory (1921)
Plato and his Contemporaries (1930)
Studies in Philosophies (1935)
Pacifism and Conscientious Objection (1945)
The Philosophy of Plato (1949)
Political Theory (1956)

References 

 ‘FIELD, Guy Cromwell’,   Who Was Who,  A & C Black,   1920–2008;     online edn,   Oxford University Press, Dec 2007       accessed 15 February 2012

Notes

1887 births
1955 deaths
Fellows of the British Academy
20th-century British philosophers
Presidents of the Aristotelian Society
Classical scholars of the University of Bristol